Denis Zivkovic was the defending champion, but lost in the second round to John Millman.
Donald Young defeated Jimmy Wang 6–2, 6–2 in the final to win the title.

Seeds

Draw

Finals

Top half

Bottom half

References
 Main Draw
 Qualifying Draw

Torneo Internacional AGT - Singles
2013 Singles